Milldale may refer to:
Milldale (Southington), Connecticut, USA
Milldale, Florida, a neighborhood of Jacksonville, Florida
Milldale, Tennessee
Milldale, Virginia, USA
Milldale, Ontario, Canada
Milldale (Peak District), close to the Derbyshire/Staffordshire boundary, England
Milldale Estate, an Australian vineyard